is a 2004 Japanese anime about Nitabō, a shamisen player, directed by Akio Nishizawa and produced by

Summary
A work depicting the life of Nitabō, the founder of the Tsugaru Shamisen style. The story shows Nitabo encountering the shamisen and performing innovative performances with historical facts and fiction. It has been selected and recommended by many institutions and organizations such as the Ministry of Education, Culture, Sports, Science and Technology, the Eilin Youth Film Council, and the Japan PTA National Council. It also won the Grand Prix in the feature film section of SICAF2006, the largest animated film festival in Asia.

Cast
 Satohi Hino as Nitabō
 Taketeru Murata as young Nitabō
 Sayaka Hanamura as Yuki
 Yumi Furukawa as young Yuki
 Tomohiko Imai as Kikunosuke
 Taya Jun as young Tomekichi
 Masako Katsuki as Tamana
 Yôsuke Naka as Kengyo
 Rokurō Naya as Osyo
 Yasunari Tajima as Tawaraboh
 Ikuko Tani as Itako
 Yae as Okinu
 Yoshie Yamamoto as Omatsu
 Akio Ōtsuka as Santaro

Production

Music
Part of the film's score was recorded in Poland and performed by the Warsaw Philharmonic Orchestra.

Animation
Certain parts of the film were animated at a much higher frame rate than usual for an animated film due to the subtle movements of the shamisen player and the calligraphy in the film. Hiromitsu Agatsuma's performance of the music scenes were filmed and matched exactly for Nitabō's performance.

Release

Box Office
The film was released in Japan on Feb. 21, 2004 and was presented during various international film festivals.

Reception
Nitabo won the Public Award for Best Animated Film at the 11th Lyon Asian Film Festival and Best Picture Youth Jury Award, chosen by the youth jury from 9 to 12 years old. Justin Sevakis at Anime News Network praised the film as a "compelling, educating and unique piece of animation, with decent storytelling and ambition to match that of its subject" but criticized its reliance on well worn tropes

References

External links
 English site for Nitaboh
 

2004 anime films
2004 films
Japanese animated films
Music in anime and manga